Who Killed Friðrik Dór? (Icelandic: Hver Drap Friðrik Dór?) is an Icelandic television comedy series, shot in a mockumentary style, developed by Snark. It is a five-part series about Vilhelm Neto, who's uncovering the conspiracy behind the alleged killing of one of Iceland's most beloved pop stars, Friðrik Dór.

It premiered in Sjónvarp Símans the 25th of February, 2021.

References 

2020s Icelandic television series
Icelandic comedy television series
Icelandic-language television shows
Television shows set in Iceland
Sjónvarp Símans original programming